Al-Daraf is a sub-district located in Sa'fan District, Sana'a Governorate, Yemen. Al-Daraf had a population of 5291  according to the 2004 census.

References 

Sub-districts in Sa'fan District